Sam Nixon and Mark Rhodes, known collectively as Sam & Mark, or simply Smark, are an English popular music and television presenting duo. They previously competed on the second series of Pop Idol in 2003, where they finished third and second, respectively, behind winner Michelle McManus. Since then, Sam & Mark have had a successful career in radio and television in the UK.

Music career
After Pop Idol, they decided to form a duo and signed with Simon Fuller. They released as a single a cover of The Beatles' song "With a Little Help from My Friends", released on Fuller's label 'S'. The song entered the UK Singles Chart at No. 1. 

The follow-up single "The Sun Has Come Your Way" released by UMTV, only reached Number 19 in the charts. 

Consequently, the pair, while working for the CBBC, were informed they were no longer allowed to release music as Sam and Mark had signed a deal with Fearne Cotton for a period of 2 years to perform both live and pre-recorded show. This resulted in Simon Fuller signing the duo out of their label and contracts, as they were concentrating on Children's shows on the CBBC. This was revealed in episode 8 of ‘Out of the Broom Cupboard’ with Chris 'Yonko' Johnson.

Broadcasting career

Radio hosts
In January 2003 Sam and Mark started on the radio. First they hosted Saturdays 10am-1pm and Sundays 11am-3pm on Gem before moving to weekdays 9am-1pm on 6 June 2005 with the chance to interview the biggest stars on their show. They left Gem on 2 June 2006. On 11 March 2007 they started to host Smash Hits Sunday breakfast from 7-11am then on 31 December 2007 hosted a whole night of DJ Sets on BBC Radio 1 to see in the new year from 6pm-5am. Their last Sunday Smash Hits Breakfast show was on 26 December 2010. Sam And Mark were Due to Come back to Gem on 1 January 2011 to host Saturday Night Gem Anthems however 3 hours before they were due on air they could not host it. On 5 August 2011 Sam and Mark were told that they could not host any more Radio Shows.

The duo present a radio show which can be heard on Free Radio across Coventry and Warwickshire. They present on Sunday mornings from 11:00 am until 1:00 pm.

Television hosts
Sam & Mark have had later a successful career as children's TV presenters, hosting various BBC programmes such as TMi, Top of the Pops Reloaded, Copycats, Sam and Mark's Guide to Dodging Disaster, Sam & Mark's Big Friday Wind-Up, Junior Bake Off, and Crackerjack! on CBBC. 

The two have managed to carve a successful television career for themselves, hosting various programmes on the BBC, most notably Saturday morning children's shows TMi and Top of the Pops Reloaded. They made their national television debut on ITV1. Sam & Mark hosted CBBC's weekday morning breakfast show, Level Up for four months from 3 April 2006 to 1 September 2006. On 16 September 2006, they hosted the first episode of TMi, a new Saturday morning TV show for the BBC on BBC Two and the CBBC Channel, alongside presenter Caroline Flack. The third series of the show ended in December 2008 and the BBC have confirmed a fourth series of the Saturday morning series for CBBC.  In 2007, Sam & Mark presented a show on CBBC called Do Something Different. Beginning on 3 January 2009, Sam and Mark's Who Wants to be a Superhero? began to air where children had to compete to be a new superhero for Stan Lee.  They were also asked to perform on Children in Need 2007.

In January 2010, they began a new show called Jump Nation which is similar to Skate Nation. They were also on a celebrity special of Total Wipeout. Neither won, losing out to glamour model Danielle Lloyd. In Sam and Mark's Guide to Dodging Disaster for CBBC they were in non-speaking roles with a voice over by Hugh Dennis. They have also presented the competition segment of This Morning on ITV1. Also on This Morning on Wednesday 28 April 2010, Sam and Mark presented an "On The Box" segment where they reviewed the latest TV shows, DVDs and movies. They then appeared on a CBBC series called Copycats and are presenters on Skate Nation. A show similar to the TMi series, but called Sam and Mark's TMi Friday began in September 2010 and finished in December and was then cancelled.

For Red Nose Day 2011 the two presented a series called Comic Relief does Glee Club, which had five 45-minute episodes, four of which were live, on BBC One. In 2012, this continued with Sport Relief does Glee Club, which had eight 30-minute episodes on CBBC and two live episodes on BBC One and CBBC. In 2013 a new series of Comic Relief does Glee Club, hosted by Naomi Wilkinson, aired in  There were then which Sam and Mark joined Naomi for the last five of the 45-minute heats.

From 2011, the duo had their own series called Sam & Mark's Big Friday Wind-Up. Similar to a prank show, the programme featured celebrity guests each week.

In 2012 Sam and Mark competed against each other in ITV's Dancing on Ice which also included the likes of Rosemary Conley, Charlene Tilton, Jennifer Ellison and Chico: Mark was 3rd to leave, Sam left in Week 9.

In 2013, Sam and Mark co-hosted a Channel 5 special, The Great Christmas Toy Giveaway, alongside Myleene Klass. The two-hour show featured guests, toy reviews, music and VTs previewing the toys and games available for Christmas and included a competition to win over £10,000 worth of toys.

In 2020, the BBC revival of Crackerjack was presented by the duo.

They presented series 3 and 4 of BBC1's Junior Bake Off in 2015 and 2016.

Sam and Mark: On the Road Show (2017)
Sam and Mark began a tour of Butlins holiday camps from February 2017, performing a new game show similar to their TV shows such as Sam and Mark's Big Friday Wind Up, TMI and Copycats. The tour ended on 3 September the same year.

Discography

Singles

Books
 The Adventures of Long Arm (2 August 2015)
 The Adventures of Long Arm 2: Long Arm vs The Evil Supply Teacher (3 March 2016)

See also
 Sam Nixon
 Mark Rhodes

Notes

References

English pop music duos
19 Recordings artists
Entertainer duos